The Pygmies ( Pygmaioi, from the adjective πυγμαῖος, from the noun πυγμή pygmē "fist, boxing, distance from elbow to knuckles," from the adverb πύξ pyx "with the fist") were a tribe of diminutive humans in Greek mythology.

Attestations 
According to the Iliad, they were involved in a constant war with the cranes, which migrated in winter to their homeland on the southern shores of the earth-encircling river Oceanus:

According to Aristotle in History of Animals, the story is true:

Hesiod wrote that Epaphus, son of Zeus, through his daughters was the ancestor of the "dark Libyans, and high-souled Aethiopians, and the Underground-folk and feeble Pygmies".

One story in Ovid describes the origin of the age-old battle, speaking of a Pygmy Queen named Gerana who offended the goddess Hera with her boasts of superior beauty, and was transformed into a crane.

In art the scene was popular with little Pygmies armed with spears and slings, riding on the backs of goats, battling the flying cranes. The 2nd-century BC tomb near Panticapaeum, Crimea "shows the battle of human pygmies with a flock of herons".

The Pygmies were often portrayed as pudgy, comical dwarves.

In another legend, the Pygmies once encountered Heracles, and climbing all over the sleeping hero attempted to bind him down, but when he stood up they fell off. The story was adapted by Jonathan Swift as a template for Lilliputians. 

St. Augustine (354–430) mentions the "Pigmies" in The City of God, Book 16, chapter 8 entitled, "Whether Certain Monstrous Races of Men Are Derived From the Stock of Adam or Noah's Sons".

Later Greek geographers and writers attempted to place the Pygmies in a geographical context. Sometimes they were located in far India, at other times near the Ethiopians of Africa. The Pygmy bush tribes of central Africa were so named after the Greek mythological creatures by European explorers in the 19th century.

Greeks used the proverbial phrase "fitting Pygmies' spoils onto a colossus", in reference "to those toiling in vain" and also in reference "to those bringing together incompatible things, and especially when we compare tiny things to huge ones".

Descriptions in literature

Ancient 
From Pliny's Natural History:

From The Life of Apollonius of Tyana by Flavius Philostratus:

From Imagines by Philostratus:

From Deipnosophistae by Athenaeus:

Medieval 
From The Travels of Sir John Mandeville:

Modern 
From Tanglewood Tales: The Pygmies by Nathaniel Hawthorne:

See also
Chalybes
Dactyl (mythology)
Telchines
Pygmy peoples

References

Sources
Aristotle, History of Animals.  Translated by D'Arcy Wentworth Thompson. Internet Classics Archive.
Homer, The Iliad of Homer.  Translated and with an Introduction by Richmond Lattimore.  The University of Chicago Press, 1961.  
Kubiĭovych, Volodymyr and Shevchenka, Naukove tovarystvo im. Ukraine: A Concise Encyclopaedia. University of Toronto, 1963. 
Mandeville, John, The Travels of Sir John Mandeville: The Fantastic 14th-Century Account of a Journey to the East, 
Ritson, Joseph, Fairy Tales, Now First Collected: To which are prefixed two dissertations: 1. On Pygmies. 2. On Fairies, London, 1831, (Adamant Media Corporation, 2004)

External links
 Theoi Project - Pygmaioi

Africa in Greek mythology
Asia in Greek mythology
Legendary tribes in Greco-Roman historiography
Elementals